Portland Fire Station No. 17, at 824 N.W. Twenty-fourth Ave. in Portland, Oregon, was built in 1912.  It was listed on the National Register of Historic Places in 1987.

It originally held a horse-drawn steam pumper and a horse-drawn ladder truck, requiring three and two horses respectively.

It was designed by Lee Gray Holden, who was serving as Battalion Chief during 1911–1922, as part of his career in Portland Fire Bureau.

References

1912 establishments in Oregon
Fire stations completed in 1912
Fire stations on the National Register of Historic Places in Oregon
Georgian architecture in Oregon
National Register of Historic Places in Portland, Oregon